is an institution of higher education in Ariake, a district in Kōtō, Tokyo, with a suburban campus in Nishitōkyō. Musashino University is uniquely focused on the ideals associated with the Hongwanji Jodo Shinshu School of Buddhism.

History 
The institution was to be based on the principles of "Buddhist-based
human education". Takakusu was a progressive thinker who stressed women's education and involvement in society. The Japanese government conferred the Order of Culture on him in 1944.

Campus 
The university has two campuses, the main one located in  Ariake and a sub-urban campus in Nishitokyo.

Ariake Campus 
The Ariake Campus was opened in 2012, with the university's administrative facilities and some of the departments and graduate schools relocated from the Nishitokyo Campus.

Faculties
The university has expanded in size and scope since its founding in the early years of the 20th century.

Graduate school
 Department of Human Sciences and Culture
 School of Language and Culture
 School of Human Sciences
 School of Social Systems
 School of Social Welfare Management

Undergraduate program
 Faculty of Literature
 Department of Japanese Language and Literature
 Department of English Language and Literature
 Faculty of Contemporary Society
 Department of Contemporary Society Studies
 Department of Social Welfare
 Faculty of Human Studies
 Department of Human Studies
 Department of Environmental Science
 Major in Design for Architectural Environment
 Major in Environment and Amenities
 Department of Early Childhood Care and Education
 Faculty of Pharmacy
 Department of Pharmaceutical Sciences
 Faculty of Nursing
 Department of Nursing
 Correspondence Division [Faculty of Human Studies] (Japanese)
Department of Human Studies
Faculty of Global Studies
 Department of Global Business (English track)
 Department of Global Communication
 Department of Japanese Communication

External links
 Official website 
 Official website

References

 
Buddhist universities and colleges in Japan
Kōtō
Nishitōkyō, Tokyo
Private universities and colleges in Japan